Alin Gheorghe Bănceu (born 30 December 1973) is a Romanian former footballer who played as a defender and midfielder. In 1997 Bănceu and his teammate, Cosmin Mariș were transferred together from Universitatea Cluj to Eredivisie team Fortuna Sittard. After he ended his playing career, he worked for a while as a general manager at Universitatea Cluj.

References

1973 births
Living people
Romanian footballers
Association football defenders
Liga I players
Liga II players
Eredivisie players
Serie C players
FC Universitatea Cluj players
CFR Cluj players
CSM Ceahlăul Piatra Neamț players
FC Progresul București players
Fortuna Sittard players
Fermana F.C. players
Romanian expatriate footballers
Expatriate footballers in the Netherlands
Romanian expatriate sportspeople in the Netherlands
Expatriate footballers in Italy
Romanian expatriate sportspeople in Italy
Romanian sports executives and administrators
People from Mediaș